Cleodoxus stockwelli is a species of longhorn beetles of the subfamily Lamiinae. It was described by Corbett in 2004, and is known from Costa Rica and Panama.

References

Beetles described in 2004
Acanthocinini